Kalakalappu is a 2012 Indian Tamil-language romantic comedy film directed by Sundar C. and produced by his wife Khushbu. It stars Vimal, Shiva, Oviya, Anjali and Santhanam, with music composed by Vijay Ebenezer. It was originally titled Masala Cafe, but was later renamed to Kalakalappu. The film released on 11 May 2012 to mixed to positive reviews, and became a commercial success. The film is 25th directorial venture for Sundar C. The film was remade in Telugu as Jump Jilani starring Allari Naresh. In 2018, the film later went into the spiritual successor Kalakalappu 2. The movie is loosely based on the 2009 German Comedy film Soul Kitchen.

Plot
Seenu runs the Kumbakonam-based Masala Café, inherited from his forefathers. Masala Café was a famous food outlet a few decades back, but has lost its prominence later, and now Seenu finds it difficult to manage. The café's chef and his granddaughter Maya stay with Seenu.

Madhavi, the new health inspector, decides to permanently shut Masala Café due to its unhygienic environment. Seenu requests her to give him some time so he can make his hotel gain its prominence once again. Slowly, Seenu and Madhavi become good friends, and love blossoms between them.

Seenu's younger brother Raghu, a thief, gets released from prison. Seenu allows Raghu to stay with him as Raghu saves him from the moneylender 'Anjuvati Alagesan' (literally 'Five-interest Alagesan'), to whom Seenu owes money. Raghu falls in love with Maya at the first sight. Manickam, a jewellery owner, stages a drama to get money from insurance. Manickam sets fire to his jewellery showroom and tries to get the insured amount by claiming loss, although he has safely hidden precious diamonds in a mobile phone which is with his nephew Kumar. Kumar misses the mobile phone containing the diamonds, which later gets into Raghu's hands.

Dharamarajan, a cunning man, is the Kumbakonam police inspector and a childhood friend of Seenu. A real estate developer plans to demolish Masala Café and construct a mall over there due to its prime location. But Seenu is not ready to sell his property as he prefers to own it in the memory of his family members. Dharmarajan assures to convince Seenu and make him sell the hotel and he talks a deal with the real estate developer.

Seenu, Raghu, Madhavi, and Maya come up with a plan to introduce traditional healthy food menu in Masala Café, believing that will be liked by the present generation. Maya's grandfather gives tips about healthy ingredients, and Masala Café becomes popular again due to differentiated menu. Seenu earns more money from Masala Café.

Meanwhile, Madhavi's wedding is fixed with her relative Vettupuli in the village by her family. Seenu goes to Madhavi's village to stop the wedding and bring her back to Kumbakonam. After a series of events, Vettupuli learns about Seenu and Madhavi's love and decides to let them marry.

When Seenu is away, Dharmarajan plans to grab Masala Café as it is now managed only by Raghu, who is addicted to gambling. Dharmarajan calls Raghu for gambling, for which Raghu accepts. Dharamarajan tricks Raghu into gambling using his hotel documents. Raghu loses the game, and Dharmarajan takes over Masala Café. Seenu gets shocked knowing that Dharmarajan has betrayed them.

Manickam tracks down that the mobile phone containing diamonds is with Raghu and comes to kill him and take back the diamonds. But Seenu and Raghu get to know about the diamonds being hidden in the mobile phone only after Manickam comes. Seenu and Raghu escape from Manickam. Manickam kidnaps Maya and Madhavi and threatens Seenu and Raghu to give back the diamonds. A fight sequence follows where Seenu and Raghu beat Manickam. In the meantime, they also grab the hotel's documents from Dharmarajan. The police restore the diamonds and arrest Dharmarajan and Manickam. Seenu unites with Madhavi and Raghu with Maya.

Cast

 Vimal as Seenu, Masala Cafe present owner
 Shiva as Raghu, Seenu's brother and shareholder
 Oviya as Maya, Masala Cafe chef's granddaughter and Raghu's girlfriend 
 Anjali as Madhavi, Health Department Officer and Seenu's girlfriend 
 Santhanam as Vettupuli, Village Chairman candidate and Madhavi's ex-fiancé
 John Vijay as Dharmarajan, Seenu's friend and Kumbakonam inspector
 Subbu Panchu as Manickam, Gold Shop Owner and main antagonist
 Ilavarasu as Anjuvatti Alagesan aka Amitabh Mama financier who gave money to Seenu and got trouble till end
 Manobala as Marudhamuthu, Vettupuli's opposite candidate
 Karunakaran as Inba Kumar, Manickam's brother-in-law
 V. S. Raghavan as Natarajan, Seenu and Maya's grandfather
 Kaali Venkat as Raghu's friend
 Shanmugasundaram as Minister Sundaram
 Vichu Vishwanath as Manickam's henchman
 Balaji K. Mohan as Chef
 Bava Lakshmanan as Mandakasaayam
 Thalapathi Dinesh as Thimeengalam
 Gowthami Vembunathan as Restaurant guest
 Yogi Babu as Pimp 'Malakottai' Shankar
 George Maryan as Constable Pachchai Perumal
 Pei Krishnan as Pei
 Kalloori Vinoth as Pickpocket

Production
A report in December 2010 suggested that Sundar C. would quit acting, after his films successively bombed at the box office, and concentrate on directing only. Sources confirmed that he began working on his next directorial by mid-2011, with Vimal and Shiva being roped in for the lead male roles. Anjali, Bindu Madhavi and Piaa Bajpai were considered for the lead female roles, with the former two being roped in. Vadivelu was expected to get a pivotal role in the film and make a comeback, but was later replaced by Santhanam. The title of the film was announced in mid-October, which was reported to be completed in one schedule. Sources further revealed that a "top actor" would be seen in a cameo appearance which eventually proved false. It was earlier buzzed that Bindu Madhavi will play second female lead but it looks like Oviya has booked a berth in this film. Filming was started in Kumbakonam. and first schedule was finished on 20 Nov 2011, Distribution rights has been given to UTV Motion Pictures. Majority of the film was shot in Gobichettipalayam. When the shooting was going in Gobichettipalayam it rained heavily but in spite of it, the shooting continued. The famous CKS bungalow in Gobichettipalayam was converted into Masala Cafe for the film. Sundar C said that idea of Kalakalappu struck him during the shooting of Murattukaalai.

Soundtrack
The music is composed by Vijay Ebenezer who earlier composed for Kanden and it was his first stint at providing commercial music. It was reported that director Sundar C. would turn lyricist, which later proved untrue. The Times of India had reported that Vimal had sung few lines for a song, but Vijay said "he did practice for the song, but due to time constraints, we could not record the final version with him".

Critical reception
Musicperk.com rated the album 6.5/10 quoting "The songs are good overall but not extraordinary". Behindwoods rated the album 3 out of 5 quoting "A nice collection of numbers. The focus is equally on masala and melody songs as well".

Release

Reception
Kalakalappu opened to positive reviews from critics. The Times of India claimed that "Kalakalappu remains true to its title and is jolly good fun throughout". Sify's critic described the film as "good fun while it lasts, with the second half better than the first". Behindwoods termed Kalakalappu as "a jolly good time". Indiaglitz wrote: "Fun unlimited, Sundar C has shown his value as a director of commercial entertainers earlier and reinforces it again with a bang with 'Kalakalappu', which sure turns out to be a summer treat". Deccan Chronicle wrote: "It's fun and funny, unpretentious and yet quite nutty!".

Rediff's Pavithra Srinivasan gave it 2.5 out of 5 stars and stated that it did have "its funny moments but only a few of them work". In.com wrote: "Kalakalappu works only in bits and pieces!". Rohit Ramachandran of Nowrunning.com rated it 2 out of 5 stating that "Sundar C's Kalakalappu conforms to Kollywood film-making by being silly unfunny mediocre nonsense."

Box office
Kalakalappu took a big opening on release day and was declared a commercial box office success. The film was released in Tamil Nadu and Karnataka in 259 screens on 11 May. The film grossed  in Tamil Nadu, Karnataka and Kerala in the first week.

Sequel
Precisely ten days after the release of 'Kalakalappu' the makers decided that the movie will have a sequel, thanks to massive response from audience from all centers. 'Kalakalappu' released on 11 May and has been declared a hit. The sequel will be produced by UTV Motion Pictures and will be feature the same actors with direction by Sundar C again. Kalakalappu 2 was slated to go on floors from January 2014 with the same leading cast. However, in 2017, it was decided that Jiiva and Jai would appear in the sequel of the film along with Nikki Galrani and Catherine Tresa as the female lead. The film finally hit the screens on 9 February 2018, to mixed reviews but was also a hit.

References

External links
 

2012 films
Indian comedy films
Indian slapstick comedy films
Tamil films remade in other languages
Films directed by Sundar C.
2010s Tamil-language films
UTV Motion Pictures films
Films set in hotels